General elections were held in Saint Helena in September 1976. They were the only elections on the island to have been contested by political parties, with the Saint Helena Progressive Party winning eleven of the twelve seats in the Legislative Council. The Saint Helena Labour Party had seen its leader Tony Thornton expelled from the island shortly before the election, and failed to win a seat.

Background
After the 1972 elections, the Progressive Party was established the following year by eleven of the twelve elected members. The Labour Party was formed in 1974. The Labour Party called for St Helenians living in Ascension Island to be able to vote.

Results
Four seats were uncontested.

Aftermath
Both parties became inactive after the election.

References

Elections in Saint Helena
Saint Helena
1976 in Saint Helena
Election and referendum articles with incomplete results